The following is a list of queen consorts, queen dowagers and grand queen dowagers of Kingdom of Joseon and empress consort and empress dowager of Korean Empire.

Title 
The Joseon dynasty (also transcribed as Chosŏn or Chosun) was a Korean dynastic kingdom that lasted for five centuries. Joseon King accepted Chinese suzerainty and acknowledged the Chinese emperor as their nominal overlord until the Gabo Reform in December 1894. The Primary Consort of the Joseon King bore the title wangbi (왕비, 王妃), translated as Queen in English, with the style of "Her Royal Highness" (mama; 마마, 媽媽). The title used in the court language was junggungjeon (중궁전, 中宮殿) or jungjeon (중전, 中殿), translated as "Center Palace" in English. Wanghu (왕후, 王后), the title for the Primary Consort of the King during pre-Joseon era, became a posthumous title.

The title Royal Queen Dowager (왕대비, 王大妃) was given to the widow of a king. Queen Dowager (대비, 大妃), originally was the short form of Royal Queen Dowager, but it became a lesser rank title during the reign of King Cheoljong and King Gojong. The widow of the previous king was called the Grand Royal Queen Dowager (대왕대비, 大王大妃),.

After Second Gabo Reform in December 1894, which proclaimed the severance of the subordinate relationship with China, royal titles also changed. The title changed from wangbi to wanghu and from wangdaebi to wangtaehu (왕태후, 王太后).

In October 1897, King Gojong proclaimed Korea as an empire and he assumed the title of Emperor (hwangje; 황제, 皇帝) in order to assert Korea's independence. Automatically, his wife held the title of empress consort (hwanghu; 황후, 皇后) and the monarch's widow held the title empress dowager (hwangtaehu; 황태후, 皇太后). From all the consorts of Joseon's ruler, only Empress Sunjeong held the rank of empress consort during her lifetime. Empress Myeongseong died in 1895, two years before the Korean Empire was proclaimed.

List

Queens and empresses consort 
Kingdom of Joseon

Korean Empire

Queens and empresses dowager 
Kingdom of Joseon

Korean Empire

Grand queens dowager

See also 
 List of monarchs of Korea

Notes

References 

Lists of queens
Royal consorts of the Joseon dynasty
Joseon, List of royal consorts of